Ctenothrips bridwelli is a species of thrips in the family Thripidae. It is found in North America.

References

Further reading

 
 
 
 
 
 

Thripidae
Articles created by Qbugbot
Insects described in 1907